Eleonora Lo Bianco (born 22 December 1979) is an Italian volleyball player.

Career
Born in Borgomanero, in her youth she played in the Omegna volleyball team. In the season 1998/1999 she was recruited to the Club Italia, a special team organized by the Italian volleyball Federation to train young players.

After that experience she played for several teams in the Italian woman Volleyball League. She is 172 cm tall and weighs 70 kg.

Lo Bianco played with her national team at the 2014 World Championship. There her team ended up in fourth place after losing 2–3 to Brazil the bronze medal match.

Clubs 
  Pallavolo Omegna (1994–1995)
  Eme Pallavolo Omegna (1995–1998)
  Club Italia (1998–1999)
  Brums Busto Arsizio (1999–2000)
  Mirabilandia Teodora Ravenna (2000–2002)
  Monte Schiavo Banca Marche Jesi (2002–2005)
  Foppapedretti Bergamo (2005–2011)
  Galatasaray Medical Park (2011–2014)
  Fenerbahçe (2014-2015)
  Volley Bergamo (2015–2017)
  Pomi Casalmaggiore (2017–)

Awards

Individual
 2005 European Championship "Best Setter"
 2006 FIVB World Grand Prix "Best Setter"
 2006–07 CEV Champions League "Best Setter"
 2009 European Championships "Best Setter"
 2009–10 CEV Indesit Champions League Final Four "Best Setter"

National Team 
 World Championship Germany 2002
 European Champion Belgium/Luxembourg 2007
 World Cup Japan 2007.
 European Champion Poland 2009
 World Cup Japan 2011.

Club 
 2003 Italian Cup— Runner-up, with Vini Monteschiavo Jesi
 2005 Italian Supercup— Runner-Up, with Volley Bergamo
 2005 Italian Cup— Runner-Up, with Volley Bergamo
 2005–06 Women's CEV Champions League— Bronze medal, with Volley Bergamo
 2005–06 Italian Championship -  Champion, with Radio 105 Foppapedretti
 2006 Italian Cup - Champion, with Radio 105 Foppapedretti
 2006–07 CEV Indesit Champions League - Champion, with Radio 105 Foppapedretti
 2008 Italian Cup - Champion, with Foppapedretti
 2008 Italian Supercup— Runner-Up, with Volley Bergamo
 2008–09 CEV Indesit Champions League - Champion, with Foppapedretti Bergamo
 2009–10 CEV Indesit Champions League - Champion, with Foppapedretti Bergamo
 2010–11 Italian Championship -  Champions, with Volley Bergamo
 2011-12 Turkish Women's Volleyball Cup -  Runner-up, with Galatasaray Daikin
 2011-12 CEV Cup -  Runner-up, with Galatasaray Daikin
 2012 Turkish Volleyball Super Cup -  Runner-Up, with Galatasaray Daikin
 2012-2013 Turkish Women's Volleyball Cup -  Bronze Medal with Galatasaray Daikin
 2014-2015 Turkish Volleyball Super Cup -  Champion, with Fenerbahçe Grundig
 2014–15 Turkish Women's Volleyball League -  Champion, with Fenerbahçe Grundig

References

External links 
 Eleonora Lo Bianco at the International Volleyball Federation
  
 Eleonora Lo Bianco at Lega Pallavolo Serie A Femminile 
 
 
 

1979 births
Living people
Sportspeople from the Province of Novara
Olympic volleyball players of Italy
Italian women's volleyball players
Volleyball players at the 2000 Summer Olympics
Volleyball players at the 2004 Summer Olympics
Volleyball players at the 2008 Summer Olympics
Volleyball players at the 2012 Summer Olympics
Galatasaray S.K. (women's volleyball) players
Fenerbahçe volleyballers
Italian expatriate sportspeople in Turkey
Volleyball players at the 2016 Summer Olympics
LGBT volleyball players
Mediterranean Games gold medalists for Italy
Mediterranean Games medalists in volleyball
Competitors at the 2001 Mediterranean Games
Competitors at the 2009 Mediterranean Games
People from Borgomanero